Charles Sackville-Germain, 5th Duke of Dorset  (27 August 176729 July 1843), known as Charles Sackville between 1767 and 1770, as Charles Germain between 1770 and 1785, and as The Viscount Sackville between 1785 and 1815, was a British peer, courtier and Tory politician. He served as Master of the Horse between 1821 and 1827 and again briefly in 1835.

Background
Born Charles Sackville, he was the eldest son of Lord George Sackville. His father changed the family surname to Germain in 1770 and was created Viscount Sackville in 1782. Dorset re-incorporated the former surname as a double-barrelled one later in life.

Career

Germain succeeded his father in the viscountcy in 1785, inheriting Drayton House. In 1815 he also succeeded his cousin in the dukedom of Dorset. In 1821 he was sworn of the Privy Council and appointed Master of the Horse under Lord Liverpool. Serving in that office until 1827 and again briefly under Sir Robert Peel from January to April 1835, he was also appointed a Knight of the Garter in 1826.

Death and memorial
Dorset died unmarried and childless in 1843 and his titles, a viscountcy and dukedom, became extinct. His memorial is in St Peter's Church, Lowick, Northamptonshire — a black lettering-etched white marble chest-tomb by Richard Westmacott, large draped mantle, coronet on cushion with a human-size angel seated alongside, its only coloured feature is its shield.

Estates

Charles had succeeded in 1785 to the vast bulk of the parish of Lowick, including the grand 13th-century-core Drayton House, replete with three towering eagles on top of its bulky gate posts. Drayton had come into the family from Sir John Germain, 1st Baronet, who died without issue in 1718, leaving it to his wife Elizabeth Germain. On her death in 1769 Charles' father, Lord George Sackville (later created 1st Viscount Sackville), inherited the estate.

Charles was also dealing with five Northamptonshire manors by recovery in 1788 and 1791. He or his predecessor in the dukedom had in addition bought more modest nearby Pyels ( Vaux) manor, Woodford, Northamptonshire between 1800 and 1843.

On his death in 1843, all the estates passed to his niece Mrs. Caroline Harriet Stopford Sackville (née Sackville) (died 1908) and had descended by 1930 into the hands of Nigel Victor Stopford Sackville, the only surviving son of her second son.

References

Cokayne et al., The Complete Peerage

|-

1767 births
1843 deaths
105
Knights of the Garter
Members of the Privy Council of the United Kingdom
Charles
Earls of Dorset